SAE International, formerly named the Society of Automotive Engineers, is a United States-based, globally active professional association and standards developing organization for engineering professionals in various industries. SAE International's world headquarters is in Warrendale, Pennsylvania, 20 miles north of Pittsburgh, Pennsylvania. Principal emphasis is placed on global transport industries such as aerospace, automotive, and commercial vehicles. The organization adopted the name SAE International to reflect the broader emphasis on mobility.

SAE International has over 138,000 global members. Membership is granted to individuals, rather than companies. Aside from its standardization efforts, SAE International also devotes resources to projects and programs in STEM education, professional certification, and collegiate design competitions.

For historical legacy reasons, the label "SAE" is commonly used on tools and hardware in North America to indicate United States customary units measurements, that is, inch-based not metric (SI). Both this usage and casual use of the term "Imperial" are loose and imprecise (but common) references to inch fractional sizes and to the screw thread sizes of the Unified Thread Standard (UTS).

SAE is also well known in the United States for its ratings of automobile horsepower.  Until 1971-1972 SAE gross power was used.  Similar to brake horsepower (bhp), it gave generously unrealistic performance ratings. Since then the more conservative SAE net power, which takes into account engine accessory, emissions, and exhaust drags (but not transmission losses) is the standard.

History
In the early 1900s there were dozens of automobile manufacturers in the United States, and many more worldwide. Auto manufacturers and parts companies joined trade groups that promoted business. A desire to solve common technical design problems and develop engineering standards was emerging. Engineers in the automobile business expressed a desire to have "free exchange of ideas" to expand their technical knowledge base.

Two magazine publishers, Peter Heldt of The Horseless Age, and Horace Swetland of The Automobile, were advocates of the concepts for SAE. Heldt wrote an editorial in June 1902 in which he said, "Now there is a noticeable tendency for automobile manufacturers to follow certain accepted lines of construction, technical questions constantly arise which seek a solution from the cooperation of the technical men connected with the industry. These questions could best be dealt with by a technical society. The field of activity for this society would be the purely technical side of automobiles."

Horace Swetland wrote on automotive engineering concerns and became an original SAE officer. About two years after Heldt's editorial, the Society of Automobile Engineers was founded in New York City. Four officers and five managing officers volunteered. In 1905 Andrew L. Riker served as president, and Henry Ford served as the society's first vice president. The initial membership was engineers with annual dues of US$10.

Over the first 10 years, SAE membership grew steadily, and the society added full-time staff and began to publish a technical journal and a comprehensive compilation of technical papers, previously called SAE Transactions, which still exist today in the form of SAE International's Journals. By 1916 SAE had 1,800 members. At the annual meeting that year, representatives from the American Society of Aeronautic Engineers, the Society of Tractor Engineers, as well as representatives from the power boating industry made a pitch to SAE for oversight of technical standards in their industries. Aeronautics was a fledgling industry at that time. Early supporters of the concept of a society to represent aeronautical engineers were Thomas Edison, Glenn Curtiss, Glenn Martin, and Orville Wright.

Out of the meeting in 1916 came a new organization, to represent engineers in all types of mobility-related professions. SAE member Elmer Sperry created the term "automotive" from Greek autos (self), and Latin motivus (of motion) origins to represent any form of self-powered vehicle. The Society of Automobile Engineers became the Society of Automotive Engineers. Ethel H. Bailey became the first woman to become a full member of the SAE in 1926, having joined the staff as a research engineer in 1920.

Charles Kettering presided over SAE during World War I and saw membership pass the 5,000 mark. During this time, SAE emphasized the importance of developing member activity through local chapters – called Sections. After World War II, the Society established links with other standards bodies and automotive engineering societies worldwide, and since then has founded sections in countries including Brazil, India, China, Russia, Romania, and Egypt. By 1980, membership surpassed 35,000 and over the next two decades the society, like the industries and individuals it serves, became larger, more global, more diverse, and more electronic.

By the mid-1980s, membership edged close to 50,000; by the end of the 1990s, membership topped 80,000 with members in more than 80 countries.

As of 2017, the society serves over 138,000 global members, with more than a quarter from outside of North America.

Timeline

Technical standards
SAE International provides a forum for companies, government agencies, research institutions and consultants to devise technical standards and recommended practices for the design, construction, and characteristics of motor vehicle components. SAE documents do not carry any legal force, but are in some cases referenced by the U.S. National Highway Traffic Safety Administration (NHTSA) and Transport Canada.

Horsepower ratings
SAE has long provided standards for rating automobile horsepower.  Until 1971-1972 SAE gross power was used.  Similar to brake horsepower (bhp), it gave generously unrealistic performance ratings. Since then, the standard has been the more conservative SAE net power, which takes into account engine accessory, emissions, and exhaust drags, but not transmission losses.

Aerospace industry standards
SAE publishes technical documents for the aerospace industry. Aerospace Recommended Practices are recommendations for engineering practice, and Aerospace Information Reports contain general accepted engineering data and information.

Levels of Autonomy

SAE has proposed an influential categorization for "levels of driving automation" in vehicular automation. SAE J3016 defines six levels of automation for cars, ranging from level 0 (No Driving Automation) to level 5 (Full Automation), transitioning gradually from "driver support features" to "automated driving features". This categorization scheme has also been adopted by the NHTSA.

Publications
SAE International has been publishing technical information since 1906. Industry magazines published monthly include: Automotive Engineering International, Aerospace Engineering and Manufacturing, Off Highway Engineering, Truck & Bus Engineering, SAE Vehicle Engineering, e-newsletters, Momentum magazine for student members, and various journals. SAE also produces the monthly Update newsletter for its members and publishes more than 100 books a year in print and electronic formats. Ranging from compilations on various technical subjects, to textbooks, to historical and enthusiast-oriented books, SAE's titles cater to a variety of readers.

In April 2007, MIT canceled its subscription to SAE because of required Digital Rights Management (DRM) technology implemented on SAE web-based database of technical papers. SAE International removed the DRM restrictions for colleges, universities, and other academic institutions.

SAE Foundation
In 1986, SAE International established the SAE Foundation to support science and technology education. One of the most pressing issues facing industry today is the decline of students enrolling in science and technology programs. This decline and its impact threaten the ability to meet future workforce demands. The SAE Foundation encourages and supports the development of skills related to mathematics, technology, engineering and science.

STEM program
A World In Motion is a teacher-administered, industry volunteer-assisted program that brings science, technology, engineering and math (STEM) education to life in the classroom for students in Kindergarten through Grade 12. Benchmarked to the national standards, AWIM incorporates the laws of physics, motion, flight and electronics into age-appropriate hands on activities that reinforce classroom STEM curriculum.

SAE Collegiate Design Series
The SAE Collegiate Design Series provides an opportunity for college students to go beyond textbook theory and replicates the process of engineering design and manufacturing. In the CDS program, a company wants to sell a product for a specific market segment, for example a radio controlled airplane, a single seat off-road vehicle, or a single seat Formula style race car. Instead of doing all the design, manufacturing and testing in house, the customer chooses to contract out those processes to a supplier, and sends their requirements out for bid. Student teams act as the suppliers and design, build and test a prototype vehicle that they believe meets the customer's specifications. Each team then presents its prototype to the customer at the annual competitions and is judged on several criteria. The team with the highest points essentially wins the contract.

The SAE Collegiate Design Series competitions include the following: 
 SAE Aero Design – a series of competitive mechanical engineering events, it is generally divided into three categories: Regular class, Advanced class and Micro class.
 Baja SAE
 eBaja SAE
 SAE Clean Snowmobile Challenge
 Formula SAE
 Formula Hybrid
 SAE Supermileage

See also

ARP4761
Association of Licensed Automobile Manufacturers
Battery terminal
Electronic control unit
FISITA
IEEE
SAE JA1002
SAE J1269
SAE J1939
SAE J2452
 SAE India
SAE steel grades

References

External links 

SAE UK Section
SAE India
SAE Brasil
SAE Australasia

Standards organizations in the United States
Engineering societies based in the United States
Companies based in Troy, Michigan
Organizations established in 1905
Automotive standards
Companies based in Allegheny County, Pennsylvania
1905 establishments in the United States